Ingerophrynus is a genus of true toads with 12 species. The genus is found in southern Yunnan and Southeast Asia; from Myanmar and Indochina to peninsular Thailand and Malaya, Sumatra, Borneo, Java, Nias Island, Sulawesi, and the Philippines. This genus was established after a major taxonomical revision of frogs in 2006.

Taxonomy and systematics
Ten of the species in this genus were formerly considered species of the genus Bufo, most of them in what had been known as the Bufo biporcatus group; the remaining ones were assigned to this genus based on molecular data. In 2007 a new species, Ingerophrynus gollum, was added to this genus. The sister taxon of Ingerophrynus is Sabahphrynus.

Etymology
The generic name Ingerophrynus honors Robert F. Inger, an American zoologist from the Field Museum of Natural History.

Description

Species
There are 12 species:

References

Bufonidae
 
Amphibian genera
Amphibians of Asia
Taxa named by Jonathan A. Campbell
Taxa named by Darrel Frost
Taxa named by Taran Grant
Taxa named by John Douglas Lynch
Taxa named by Ronald Archie Nussbaum
Taxa named by Christopher John Raxworthy